St Enoch subway station is a station on the Glasgow Subway in Scotland. Although it does not have direct interchange with the main line railway, it is located approximately halfway between Glasgow Central railway station and Argyle Street railway station, within a few minutes' walk to both. The subway station is accessible via St Enoch Square.

Usage of the entire subway in 2007/08 was 14.45 million passengers, increased from 13.14 million in 2005/06.

Original building

Above ground, the original station building housed both a booking office and the headquarters of the original Glasgow District Subway Railway Company. This was (and is) the subway's most distinctive building - an ornate, Flemish Renaissance, late Victorian red sandstone structure; designed by James Miller in 1896. It still stands - it was carefully preserved during the modernisation of the subway in 1977, even being jacked up in the air for a while, during reconstruction of the subsurface platforms.

The building was no longer used as a ticket office following the 1977-1980 modernisation; it became a travel information centre by SPT. The building became disused with the Travel Centre facilities being moved to the underground ticket hall in 2008. In December 2009, a Caffè Nero coffee shop was established in the building. It is now protected as a category A listed building.

St Enoch includes a lift and escalator. Along with Govan subway station, it is one of two Glasgow Subway stations that is wheelchair accessible.

Refurbishment (2010s)

As part of the wider refurbishment of the city's subway, St Enoch station received new glass canopies for each entrance, and an overhaul of the ticket hall.

Past passenger numbers 
 2011/12: 1.857 million annually

Gallery

References

Glasgow Subway stations
Category A listed buildings in Glasgow
Listed railway stations in Scotland
Railway stations in Great Britain opened in 1896
James Miller railway stations
Renaissance Revival architecture in the United Kingdom